The Old House Museum in the town of Bakewell in Derbyshire is a typical 16th century yeoman's house that now houses a small museum with an exhibition of local life and artefacts.

History 
The house was originally owned by the Dean and Chapter of Lichfield. and was built as a tithe (tax collectors dwelling).  Built in 1534 of vernacular construction it formed the four southern rooms of the present building.  The house was extended in 1549 reflecting the growing prosperity from the tithe collecting.

Admission 
The museum is open daily from 11 am to 4 pm from 25 March to 5 November. 
Admission prices are £5 for adults  £2.50 for children and £14.00 for a family ticket  ( 2 adults and up to 3 children)as of October 2019. Tickets are valid for 12 months.
Group visits with catering, guided tours and town walks are all bookable on request.

See also
Grade II* listed buildings in Derbyshire Dales
Listed buildings in Bakewell

References

External links 
 Museum website

Tourist attractions of the Peak District
Museums in Derbyshire
Bakewell